Kutschera is a Bohemian and Austrian noble family descended from  Matthäus Kutschera (died 1755), a burgher of Leitmeritz, who became an accountant for the Prämonstratenserstift Strahow outside Prague. Carl Kutschera, deputy state accountant of Bohemia (Vize-Landesbuchhalter in Böhmen), was ennobled by letters patent in Vienna on 8 March 1805. On 19 April 1819, his sons, General and Feldzeugmeister Johann Nepomuk von Kutschera, county governor of Saaz Joseph von Kutschera and Imperial-Royal war council secretary (Hofkriegsratssekretär) Anton von Kutschera, were raised to baronial rank. On 31 August 1821, the family received the Bohemian Inkolat.

References

Bohemian noble families
Austrian noble families